Trebor may refer to:

Trebor (confectionery), a British confectionery company
Trebor (composer), a 14th-century composer
Robert Trebor, an actor
Trebor Healey, an American poet and novelist
Trebor Edwards, a Welsh tenor
The title character of Wizardry: Proving Grounds of the Mad Overlord and its sequels